Asiablatta kyotensis, formerly in the genus Parcoblatta, is an endemic roach from Far Eastern Asia.  On June 24, 1962, an unfamiliar male roach was captured in Kyoto City.  This cockroach was an entirely unknown insect from Japan, and was later described as Parcoblatta kyotensis by Asahina in 1976.

Habitat
Found gathered around rotting trees and tree sap.

Distribution
A. kyotensis are known to be in China (Shanghai, Zhejiang), Japan, southern and western parts of South Korea.

Description
Male: Body length measures around 14.5 to 18 millimeters, forewing length measures from 13 to 15.5 millimeters. Adult females are broader and have slightly shorter wings than adult males.

Gallery

References

Insects described in 1976
Insects of Japan
Insects of China
Insects of Korea
Cockroaches